John Joe Dykes (30 October 1898 – 25 June 1976) was an Irish footballer. He competed in the men's tournament at the 1924 Summer Olympics.

References

External links

1898 births
1976 deaths
Irish association footballers (before 1923)
Olympic footballers of Ireland
Footballers at the 1924 Summer Olympics
People from Sligo (town)
Association football midfielders
Athlone Town A.F.C. players